Okwelle is a town in Onuimo Local Government Area of Imo State, Nigeria. It comprises original eight villages known as Okwelle "Ama Asato" according to the Colonial documents of 1908 containing the list of "MBAs" "ISI-MBAs" and "ONUMAs" : Therefore the Eight villages were as follows : Umuduruodu Umumbo,Umuoji, Amaedo, D, Umuduruebo/Umudurajonmai Umoko/Alaike and Umuagwo/ Umuoma. Okwelle's Central Market (Ekego) attracts traders from neighbouring towns across the States within the SouthEastern Nigeria.

Location and Boundaries
Okwelle is surrounded by major towns including Umunachi, Abba, Dikenafai, Okwe and Ezike. Okwelle is blessed with several sources of fresh water, including springs, lakes, inland water channels and seasonal runoffs. According to Floyd Barry, 'from Okwelle, to Imo River, a constriction of the Cuesta landforms takes places, but east again beyond the river, the uplands broaden to a dissected plateau around Bende separated by only a few miles from the Okigwe-Ngusu-Arochukwu Cuesta and related features.'

References

External links

Towns in Imo State